Luis Roberto García Toral (born 30 May 1973) is a Spanish retired footballer who played mainly as a right back.

Club career
Born in León, García managed to appear twice for Valencia CF's first team during the 1993–94 season in La Liga, but spent his career mainly in the second and third divisions. He made his debut in the top tier on 20 March 1994, playing 60 minutes in a 1–0 home win against Sporting de Gijón.

García represented, other than Valencia, CD Castellón, Andorra CF, CP Almería, UE Figueres, CD Badajoz, UDA Gramenet, Terrassa FC and SD Huesca. In June 2011, after contributing with 12 matches (ten starts, 914 minutes of action) as the last club retained its second level status, he retired from football at the age of 38.

References

External links

CiberChe biography and stats 

1973 births
Living people
Sportspeople from León, Spain
Spanish footballers
Footballers from Castile and León
Association football defenders
La Liga players
Segunda División players
Segunda División B players
Valencia CF Mestalla footballers
Valencia CF players
CD Castellón footballers
CP Almería players
UE Figueres footballers
CD Badajoz players
UDA Gramenet footballers
Terrassa FC footballers
SD Huesca footballers
Spain youth international footballers